Gabriel Adrián Díaz (born 17 October 1989) is an Argentinian football player, who plays for Ferro Carril Oeste.

References
 
 

1989 births
Living people
Argentine footballers
Argentine expatriate footballers
Association football defenders
Gimnasia y Esgrima de Jujuy footballers
Defensores de Belgrano footballers
CSyD Tristán Suárez footballers
San Luis de Quillota footballers
Everton de Viña del Mar footballers
Club Deportivo Palestino footballers
Flandria footballers
Ferro Carril Oeste footballers
Club Atlético Patronato footballers
Primera B de Chile players
Chilean Primera División players
Argentine expatriate sportspeople in Chile
Expatriate footballers in Chile
Footballers from Buenos Aires